Paradise Township is one of twelve townships in Coles County, Illinois, USA.  As of the 2010 census, its population was 1,351 and it contained 679 housing units.

Geography

Cities, towns, villages
 Mattoon (southwest edge)

Unincorporated towns
 Etna
 Paradise
(This list is based on USGS data and may include former settlements.)

Cemeteries
The township contains four cemeteries: Campground, Dry Grove, Old Baptist and Zion Hill.

Major highways
  Interstate 57
  US Route 45
  Illinois Route 121

Demographics

School districts
 Mattoon Community Unit School District 2
 Neoga Community Unit School District 3

Political districts
 Illinois's 15th congressional district
 State House District 110
 State Senate District 55

References
 
 United States Census Bureau 2007 TIGER/Line Shapefiles
 United States National Atlas

External links
 City-Data.com
 Illinois State Archives

Adjacent townships 

Townships in Coles County, Illinois
Townships in Illinois